is 1958 Japanese romance-drama film in technicolor, directed by Koji Shima.

Film cast 
 Machiko Kyō as Aya Koyanagi
 Hiroshi Kawaguchi as Takeshi Koyanagi
 Kenji Sugawara as Rentaro Shinohara
 Hitomi Nozoe as Kana Shinohara
 Junko Kano as Fusae Shimazaki
 Tanie Kitabayashi as Tetsu Koyanagi
 Kyu Sazanka as Saburo Maeda
 Chieko Naniwa as Yone
 Michiko Ono as Shinko
 Teruko Kishi as Kinoshita
 Fujio Harumoto as Maruyama
 Yoshiro Kitahara as Shimizu
 Kiyoko Hirai as Mrs. Sekine
 Atsuko Kindaichi as Sekine's daughter
 Yoshihiro Hamaguchi as Hirota
 Frank Nagai as himself (singing)
 Mariko Ogasawara as maid at Koyanagi's
 Minami Satoko as Sadako Yamanaka
 Ryuji Shinagawa as announcer

References

External links 
 

Japanese romantic drama films
1958 films
Films directed by Koji Shima
1950s Japanese films